Adel Habib Beldi (born July 9, 1994) is an Algerian football who plays as a striker. He is a striker and a former Lekhwiya SC in the Qatar Stars League.

Club career
On April 15, 2011, Beldi made his professional debut for Lekhwiya known as know Duhail Sc as a substitute in a league match against Al Rayyan. as being considered the youngest player in the league

Honours
 Won the Qatar Stars League once with Lekhwiya in 2011

References 

1994 births
Living people
Algerian footballers
Association football forwards
Aspire Academy (Qatar) players
Lekhwiya SC players
Lusail SC players
Qatar Stars League players
Qatari Second Division players
People from Annaba
Expatriate footballers in Qatar
Algerian expatriate sportspeople in Qatar
21st-century Algerian people